"Dirt" is a song recorded by American country music duo Florida Georgia Line. It is the first single from their second studio album, Anything Goes, which was released on October 14, 2014.

Content
Written by Rodney Clawson and Chris Tompkins, the song is a mid-tempo ballad about various life events centering on dirt. The final lines of the song include the lyrics "You know you came from it / Someday you'll return to it", which the duo initially did not want to include as they felt it was a cliché. However they eventually decided to include the line. Brian Kelley, one-half of the duo, told the Chicago Sun-Times, "I think a 'Cruise'-type song would have been accepted, but just when you think you have FGL figured out, we wanted to go against the grain and change it up with a song like 'Dirt'".

Music video
The music video was directed by Nigel Dick. It follows the life of a married couple, alternating between the past and present, where the family is gathered for the mother's funeral. The video has a lot of visual references to dirt. Dirt is portrayed as a substance that you can smear in the face of your loved ones one minute, then bury family in it the next. It stars J. D. Souther in the leading role and Lindsay Heyser as the young Rosie.

Commercial performance
"Dirt" debuted at number 16 on the Country Airplay chart for the week of July 26, 2014, becoming the highest-airplay debut by a country duo. "Dirt" also debuted on the US Billboard Hot 100 at number 11 and on the Canadian Hot 100 the same week at number 10, being the "Hot Shot Debut" of the week on both charts. Also during the same week, "Dirt" jumped from number 40 to number one on the Billboard Hot Country Songs chart. On its final week on the chart, for the week of January 10, 2015, the song jumped from number 22 to number 11 on the Hot Country Songs chart and was the airplay garner for the week. Afterwards, however, the song dropped off the charts.

"Dirt" is the sixth consecutive single of the duo to peak in the top 5 on the Billboard Hot Country Songs chart. The song reached its million sales mark in the US in October 2014. As of December 2014, the song has sold 1,272,000 copies in the US. The song was certified double Platinum on April 30, 2015.

In Canada, the song sold 17,000 downloads in its debut week.

Chart positions

Year-end charts

Certifications

References

2014 singles
2014 songs
Florida Georgia Line songs
Songs written by Rodney Clawson
Songs written by Chris Tompkins
Song recordings produced by Joey Moi
Republic Records singles
Republic Nashville singles
Music videos directed by Nigel Dick
Country ballads